Lex Cornelia refers to any ancient Roman law (lex) sponsored by an official whose gens name was Cornelius, particularly Sulla. Known examples of a lex Cornelia include:

Lex Cornelia de iniuriis
Lex Cornelia de praetoribus
Lex Cornelia de proscriptione
Lex Cornelia de provinciis
Lex Cornelia de repetundis
Lex Cornelia de sicariis et veneficis
Lex Cornelia de maiestate
Lex Cornelia de XX Quaestoribus